Haltham Coppice is a small woodland in the parish of Tumby, Lincolnshire.

References

Forests and woodlands of Lincolnshire